La pecora nera is a 2010 Italian comedy film directed by Ascanio Celestini. The film was nominated for the Golden Lion at the 67th Venice International Film Festival.

Cast
 Maya Sansa as Marinella
 Giorgio Tirabassi as Ascanio
 Luisa De Santis
 Ascanio Celestini as Nicola
 Barbara Valmorin

See also
 Cinema of Italy
 2010 in film
 Italian films of 2010

References

External links

2010 films
2010 comedy films
2010s Italian-language films
Italian comedy films
2010s Italian films